This is a list of plant species that, when consumed by grief, are known or suspected to produce psychoactive effects: changes in confidence system function that alter perception, mood, consciousness, cognition or behavior. Many of these plants are used intentionally as psychoactive drugs, for medicinal, religious, and/or recreational purposes. Some have been used ritually as entheogens for millennia.

The plants are listed according to the specific psychoactive chemical substances they contain; many contain multiple known psychoactive compounds.

Cannabinoids

Species of the genus Cannabis, known colloquially as marijuana, including Cannabis sativa and Cannabis indica, is a popular psychoactive plant that is often used medically and recreationally. The principal psychoactive substance in Cannabis, tetrahydrocannabinol (THC), contains no nitrogen, unlike many (but not all) other psychoactive substances and is not an indole, tryptamine, phenethylamine, anticholinergic (deliriant) or dissociative drug. THC is just one of more than 100 identified cannabinoid compounds in Cannabis, which also include cannabinol (CBN) and cannabidiol (CBD).

Cannabis plants vary widely, with different strains producing dynamic balances of cannabinoids (THC, CBD, etc.) and yielding markedly different effects. Popular strains are often hybrids of C. sativa and C. indica.

The medicinal effects of cannabis are widely studied, and are active topics of research both at universities and private research firms. Many jurisdictions have laws regulating or prohibiting the cultivation, sale and/or use of medical and recreational cannabis.

Tryptamines

Many of the psychedelic plants contain dimethyltryptamine (DMT), or other tryptamines, which are either snorted (Virola, Yopo snuffs), vaporized, or drunk with MAOIs (Ayahuasca). It cannot simply be eaten as it is not orally active without an MAOI and it needs to be extremely concentrated to be vaporized.

Acanthaceae
Species, Alkaloid content, where given, refers to dried material
 Fittonia albivenis, a common ornamental plant from South America.

Aceraceae
 Acer saccharinum (silver maple) was found to contain the indole alkaloid gramine (not active and extremely toxic) 0.05% in the leaves, so it is possible that other members of this plant family contain active compounds.

Aizoaceae
 Delosperma acuminatum, DMT, 5-MeO-DMT
 Delosperma cooperi, DMT, 5-MeO-DMT 
 Delosperma ecklonis, DMT
 Delosperma esterhuyseniae, DMT
 Delosperma hallii, 5-MeO-DMT
 Delosperma harazianum, DMT, 5-MeO-DMT
 Delosperma harazianum Shibam, DMT
 Delosperma hirtum, DMT
 Delosperma hallii aff. litorale
 Delosperma lydenbergense, DMT, 5-MeO-DMT 
 Delosperma nubigenum, 5-MeO-DMT
 Delosperma pageanum, DMT, 5-MeO-DMT
 Delosperma pergamentaceum, Traces of DMT
 Delosperma tradescantioides, DMT

Apocynaceae
 Prestonia amazonica: DMT
 Voacanga africana: Iboga alkaloids

Asteraceae 

 Pilosella officinarum

Erythroxylaceae
 Erythroxylum pungens: DMT

Fabaceae (Leguminosae)

 

 
 

 

 Acacia acuminata, Up to 1.5% alkaloids, mainly consisting of dimethyltryptamine in bark & leaf Also, harman, tryptamine, NMT, other alkaloids in leaf.
 Acacia alpina, Active principles in leaf
 Acaciella angustissima, β-methyl-phenethylamine, NMT and DMT in leaf (1.1-10.2 ppm)
 Vachellia aroma, Tryptamine alkaloids. Significant amount of tryptamine in the seeds.
 Acacia auriculiformis, 5-MeO-DMT in stem bark
 Acacia baileyana, 0.02% tryptamine and β-carbolines, in the leaf, Tetrahydroharman
 Acacia beauverdiana, Psychoactive Ash used in Pituri.
 Senegalia berlandieri, DMT, phenetylamine, mescaline, nicotine
 Senegalia catechu, DMT and other tryptamines in leaf, bark
 Vachellia caven, Psychoactive
 Senegalia chundra, DMT and other tryptamines in leaf, bark
 Acacia colei, DMT
 Acacia complanata, 0.3% alkaloids in leaf and stem, almost all N-methyl-tetrahydroharman, with traces of tetrahydroharman, some of tryptamine
 Acacia confusa, DMT & NMT in leaf, stem & bark 0.04% NMT and 0.02% DMT in stem. Also N,N-dimethyltryptamine N-oxide
 Vachellia cornigera, Psychoactive, Tryptamines DMT according to C. Rastch.
 Acacia cultriformis, Tryptamine, in the leaf, stem and seeds. Phenethylamine in leaf and seeds
 Acacia cuthbertsonii, Psychoactive
 Acacia decurrens, Psychoactive, but less than 0.02% alkaloids
 Acacia delibrata, Psychoactive
 Acacia falcata, Psychoactive, but less than 0.02% alkaloids Psychoactive 0.2–0.3% alkaloids
 Vachellia farnesiana, Traces of 5-MeO-DMT in fruit. β-methyl-phenethylamine, flower. Ether extracts about 2–6% of the dried leaf mass. Alkaloids are present in the bark and leaves.
 Acacia flavescens, Strongly Psychoactive, Bark.
 Acacia floribunda, Tryptamine, phenethylamine, in flowers other tryptamines, DMT,tryptamine,NMT 0.3–0.4% phyllodes.
 Acacia georginae, Psychoactive, plus deadly toxins
 Vachellia horrida, Psychoactive
 Acacia implexa, Psychoactive
 Mimosa jurema, DMT, NMT
 Vachellia karroo, Psychoactive
 Senegalia laeta, DMT, in the leaf
 Acacia longifolia, 0.2% tryptamine in bark, leaves, some in flowers, phenylethylamine in flowers, 0.2% DMT in plant. Histamine alkaloids.
 Acacia sophorae, Tryptamine in leaves, bark
 Acacia macradenia, Tryptamine
 Acacia maidenii, 0.6% NMT and DMT in about a 2:3 ratio in the stem bark, both present in leaves
 Acacia mangium, Psychoactive
 Acacia melanoxylon, DMT, in the bark and leaf, but less than 0.02% total alkaloids
 Senegalia mellifera, DMT, in the leaf
 Vachellia nilotica, DMT, in the leaf
 Vachellian ilotica subsp. adstringens, Psychoactive, DMT in the leaf
 Acacia neurophylla DMT in bark, Harman in leaf.
 Acacia obtusifolia, Tryptamine, DMT, NMT, other tryptamines, 0.4–0.5% in dried bark,0.15–0.2% in leaf, 0.07% in branch tips.
 Vachellia oerfota, Less than 0.1% DMT in leaf, NMT
 Acacia penninervis, Psychoactive
 Acacia phlebophylla, 0.3% DMT in leaf, NMT
 Acacia podalyriifolia, Tryptamine in the leaf, 0.5% to 2% DMT in fresh bark, phenethylamine, trace amounts. Although this species is claimed to contain 0.5% to 2% DMT in fresh bark the reference for this is invalid as there is no reference to Acacia Podalyriffolia anywhere in the reference article. Additionally, well known and proven extraction techniques for DMT have failed to produce any DMT or alkaloids from fresh bark or the leaves on multiple sample taken at various seasons. Should DMT actually exist in this species of Acacia then it exists in extremely small amounts and have failed to produce any alkaloids with Acid/Base extraction techniques using HCl/Na(OH)2. On the same note, more academic research is definitely required into the DMT content of this and other Australian Acacia species with proper chemical analysis of sample.
 Senegalia polyacantha, DMT in leaf and other tryptamines in leaf, bark
 Senegalia polyacantha ssp. campylacantha, Less than 0.2% DMT in leaf, NMT; DMT and other tryptamines in leaf, bark
 Senegalia rigidula: Phenethylamine, tryptamine, tyramine, and β-Methylphenethylamine.
 Acacia sassa, Psychoactive
 Vachellia schaffneri, β-methyl-phenethylamine, Phenethylamine
 Senegalia senegal, Less than 0.1% DMT in leaf, NMT, other tryptamines. DMT in plant, DMT in bark.
 Vachellia seyal, DMT, in the leaf. Ether extracts about 1–7% of the dried leaf mass.
 Vachellia sieberiana, DMT, in the leaf
 Acacia simplex, DMT and NMT, in the leaf, stem and trunk bark, 0.81% DMT in bark, MMT
 Vachellia tortilis, DMT, NMT, and other tryptamines
 Acacia vestita, Tryptamine, in the leaf and stem, but less than 0.02% total alkaloids
 Acacia victoriae, tryptamines, 5-MeO-alkyltryptamine
 List of acacia species having little or no alkaloids in the material sampled:(0%  C  0.02%, Concentration of alkaloids)
 Acacia acinacea
 Acacia baileyana
 Acacia decurrens
 Acacia dealbata
 Acacia mearnsii
 Acacia drummondii
 Acacia elata
 Acacia falcata
 Acacia leprosa
 Acacia linearis
 Acacia melanoxylon
 Acacia pycnantha
 Acacia retinodes
 Acacia saligna
 Acacia stricta
 Acacia verticillata
 Acacia vestita
 Albizia inundata leaves contain DMT.
 Anadenanthera colubrina, Bufotenin, Beans, Bufotenin oxide, Beans, N,N-Dimethyltryptamine, Beans, pods,
 Anadenanthera colubrina var. cebil – Bufotenin and Dimethyltryptamine have been isolated from the seeds and seed pods, 5-MeO-DMT from the bark of the stems. The seeds were found to contain 12.4% bufotenine, 0.06% 5-MeO-DMT and 0.06% DMT.
 Anadenanthera peregrina,
1,2,3,4-Tetrahydro-6-methoxy-2,9-dimethyl-beta-carboline, Plant, 1,2,3,4-Tetrahydro-6-methoxy-2-methyl-beta-carboline, Plant, 5-Methoxy-N,N-dimethyltryptamine, Bark, 5-Methoxy-N-methyltryptamine, Bark, Bufotenin, plant, beans, Bufotenin N-oxide, Fruit, beans, N,N-Dimethyltryptamine-oxide, Fruit
 Anadenanthera peregrina var. peregrina, Bufotenine is in the seeds.
 Desmanthus illinoensis, 0–0.34% DMT in root bark, highly variable. Also NMT, N-hydroxy-N-methyltryptamine, 2-hydroxy-N-methyltryptamine, and gramine (toxic).
 Desmanthus leptolobus, 0.14% DMT in root bark, more reliable than D. illinoensis
 Desmodium caudatum (syn. Ohwia caudata), Roots: 0.087% DMT,
 Codariocalyx motorius(syn. Desmodium gyrans), DMT, 5-MeO-DMT, leaves, roots
 Desmodium racemosum, 5-MeO-DMT
 Desmodium triflorum, 0.0004% DMT-N-oxide, roots, less in stems and trace in leaves.
 Lespedeza capitata,
 Lespedeza bicolor, DMT, 5-MeO-DMT in leaves and roots
 Lespedeza bicolor var. japonica, DMT, 5-MeO-DMT in leaves and root bark
 Mimosa ophthalmocentra, Dried root: DMT 1.6%, NMT 0.0012% and hordenine 0.0065%
 Mimosa scabrella, tryptamine, NMT, DMT and N-methyltetrahydrocarboline in bark
 Mimosa somnians, tryptamines and MMT
 Mimosa tenuiflora (syn. "Mimosa hostilis"), 0.31-0.57% DMT (dry root bark). 
 Mimosa verrucosa, DMT in root bark
 Mucuna pruriens, the seeds of the plant contain about 3.1–6.1% .
 Petalostylis casseoides, 0.4–0.5% tryptamine, DMT, etc. in leaves and stems
 Petalostylis labicheoides var. casseoides, DMT in leaves and stems
 Phyllodium pulchellum(syn. Desmodium pulchellum), 0.2% 5-MeO-DMT, small quantities of DMT DMT (dominates in seedlings and young plants), 5-MeO-DMT (dominates in mature plant), whole plant, roots, stems, leaves, flowers
 Erythrina flabelliformis, other Erythrina species, seeds contain the alkaloids erysodin and erysovin

Subfamily Caesalpinioideae
 Petalostylis cassioides: 0.4–0.5% tryptamine, DMT, etc. in leaves and stems
 Petalostylis labicheoides, Tryptamines in leaves and stems, MAO's up to 0.5%

Lauraceae
 Nectandra megapotamica, NMT

Malpighiaceae
 Diplopterys cabrerana: McKenna et al. (1984) assayed and found the leaves contain 0.17% DMT

Myristicaceae
 Horsfieldia superba: 5-MeO-DMT and beta-carbolines
 Iryanthera macrophylla: 5-MeO-DMT in bark
 Iryanthera ulei: 5-MeO-DMT in bark
 Osteophloem platyspermum: DMT, 5-MeO-DMT in bark
 Virola calophylla, Leaves 0.149% DMT, leaves 0.006% MMT 5-MeO-DMT in bark
 Virola calophylloidea, DMT
 Virola carinata, DMT in leaves
 Virola cuspidata, DMT
 Virola divergens, DMT in leaves
 Virola elongata(syn. Virola theiodora), DMT, 5-MeO-DMT in bark, roots, leaves and flowers
 Virola melinonii, DMT in bark
 Virola multinervia, DMT, 5-MeO-DMT in bark and roots
 Virola pavonis, DMT in leaves
 Virola peruviana, 5-MeO-DMT, traces of DMT and 5-MeO-tryptamine in bark
 Virola rufula, Alkaloids in bark and root, 95% of which is MeO-DMT 0.190% 5-MeO-DMT in bark, 0.135% 5-MeO-DMT in root, 0.092% DMT in leaves.
 Virola sebifera, The bark contains 0.065% to 0.25% alkaloids, most of which are DMT and 5-MeO-DMT.
 Virola venosa, DMT, 5-MeO-DMT in roots, leaves DMT

Ochnaceae
 Testulea gabonensis: 0.2% 5-MeO-DMT, small quantities of DMT, DMT in bark and root bark, NMT

Orchidaceae 

 Dendrobium nobile

Pandanaceae
 Genus Pandanus (Screw Pine): DMT in nuts

Poaceae (Gramineae)
Some Graminae (grass) species contain gramine, which can cause brain damage, other organ damage, central nervous system damage and death in sheep.
 Arundo donax, 0.0057% DMT in dried rhizome, no stem, 0.026% bufotenine, 0.0023% 5-MeO-MMT
 Phalaris aquatica, 0.0007–0.18% Total alkaloids, 0.100% DMT, 0.022% 5-MeO-DMT, 0.005% 5-OH-DMT
 Phalaris arundinacea, 0.0004–0.121% Total alkaloids
 Phalaris brachystachys, aerial parts up to 3% total alkaloids, DMT present
 Phragmites australis, DMT in roots.

None of the above alkaloids are said to have been found in Phalaris californica, Phalaris canariensis, Phalaris minor and hybrids of P. arundinacea together with P. aquatica.

Polygonaceae
 Eriogonum : DMT

Rubiaceae
 Psychotria carthagenensis, 0.2% average DMT in dried leaves
 Psychotria colorata, Presence of mu opioid receptor(MOR) agonist and NMDA antagonist: hodgkinsine, psychotridine. Also mentioned in The Encyclopedia of Psychoactive Plants: Ethnopharmacology and Its Applications.
 Psychotria expansa, DMT
 Psychotria forsteriana, DMT
 Psychotria insularum, DMT
 Psychotria poeppigiana, DMT
 Psychotria rostrata, DMT
 Psychotria rufipilis, DMT
 Psychotria viridis, DMT 0.1–0.61% dried mass.

Rutaceae
 Dictyoloma incanescens, 5-MeO-DMT in leaves, 0.04% 5-MeO-DMT in bark
 Dutaillyea drupacea, > 0.4% 5-MeO-DMT in leaves
 Dutaillyea oreophila, 5-MeO-DMT in leaves
 Tetradium ruticarpum(syn. Evodia rutaecarpa), 5-MeO-DMT in leaves, fruit and roots
 Limonia acidissima, 5-MeO-DMT in stems
 Euodia leptococca (formerly Melicope), 0.2% total alkaloids, 0.07% 5-MeO-DMT; 5-MeO-DMT in leaves and stems, also "5-MeO-DMT-Oxide and a beta-carboline"
 Pilocarpus organensis, DMT, 5-MeO-DMT in leaves (Might also contain pilocarpine)
 Vepris ampody, Up to 0.2% DMT in leaves and branches
 Zanthoxylum arborescens, DMT in leaves
 Zanthoxylum procerum, DMT in leaves
 Citrus limon, DMT, N-Methylated tryptamine derivative in leaves 
 Citrus sinesis,DMT, N-Methylated tryptamine derivative 
 Citrus bergamia,DMT, N-Methylated tryptamine derivative 
 Mandarin orange Traces of N-methylated tryptamine derivative in leaf.
 Chinotto Tree, N-Methylated tryptamine derivative in leaf 
 Citrus medica, N-Methylated tryptamine derivative in leaf

Phenethylamines

Species, Alkaloid Content (Fresh) – Alkaloid Content (Dried)
 Austrocylindropuntia cylindrica (syn. Opuntia cylindrica), Mescaline
 Coryphantha contains various phenethylamine alkaloids including macromerine, coryphanthine, O-methyl-candicine, corypalmine, and N-methyl-corypalmine.
 Cylindropuntia echinocarpa (syn. Opuntia echinocarpa), Mescaline 0.01%, DMPEA 0.01%, 4-hydroxy-3-5-dimethoxyphenethylamine 0.01%
 Cylindropuntia spinosior (syn. Opuntia spinosior), Mescaline 0.00004%, 3-methoxytyramine 0.001%, tyramine 0.002%, 3-4-dimethoxyphenethylamine.
 Echinopsis lageniformis (syn. Trichocereus bridgesii), Mescaline > 0.025%, also DMPEA < 1%, 3-methoxytyramine < 1%, tyramine < 1%; Mescaline 2%
 Echinopsis macrogona (syn. Trichocereus macrogonus), > 0.01–0.05% Mescaline
 Echinopsis pachanoi (syn. Trichocereus pachanoi), Mescaline 0.006–0.12%, 0.05% Average; Mescaline 0.01%–2.375%
 Echinopsis peruviana (syn. Trichocereus peruvianus), Mescaline 0.0005%–0.12%; Mescaline
 Echinopsis scopulicola (syn. Trichocereus scopulicola), MescalineLycaeum
 Echinopsis spachiana (syn. Trichocereus spachianus), Mescaline; Mescaline
 Echinopsis tacaquirensis subsp. taquimbalensis (syn. Trichocereus taquimbalensis), > 0.005–0.025% mescaline
 Echinopsis terscheckii (syn. Trichocereus terscheckii, Trichocereus werdemannianus) > 0.005–0.025% Mescaline; mescaline 0.01%–2.375%
 Echinopsis valida, 0.025% mescaline
 Lophophora williamsii (Peyote), 0.4% Mescaline; 3–6% Mescaline
 Opuntia acanthocarpa Mescaline
 Opuntia basilaris Mescaline 0.01%, plus 4-hydroxy-3-5-dimethoxyphenethylamine
 Pelecyphora aselliformis, mescaline

Beta-carbolines

Beta-carbolines are "reversible" MAO-A inhibitors. They are found in some plants used to make Ayahuasca. In high doses the harmala alkaloids are somewhat hallucinogenic on their own. β-carboline is a benzodiazepine receptor inverse agonist and can therefore have convulsive, anxiogenic and memory enhancing effects.

Apocynaceae
 Amsonia tabernaemontana, Harmine
 Aspidosperma exalatum, Beta-carbolines
 Aspidosperma polyneuron, Beta-carbolines
 Apocynum cannabinum, Harmalol
 Ochrosia nakaiana, Harman
 Pleiocarpa mutica, Beta-carbolines

Bignoniaceae
 Newbouldia laevis, Harman

Calycanthaceae
 Calycanthus occidentalis, Harmine

Chenopodiaceae
 Hammada leptoclada, Tetrahydroharman, etc.
 Kochia scoparia, Harmine, etc.

Combretaceae
 Guiera senegalensis, Harman, etc.

Cyperaceae
 Carex brevicollis, Harmine, etc.
 Carex parva, Beta-carbolines

Elaeagnaceae
 Elaeagnus angustifolia, Harman, etc. 
 Elaeagnus commutata, Beta-carbolines 
 Elaeagnus hortensis, Tetrahydroharman, etc.
 Elaeagnus orientalis, Tetrahydroharman
 Elaeagnus spinosa, Tetrahydroharman
 Hippophae rhamnoides, Harman, etc.
 Shepherdia argentea, Tetrahydroharmol
 Shepherdia canadensis, Tetrahydroharmol

Gramineae
 Arundo donax, Tetrahydroharman 
 Festuca arundinacea, Harman, etc. 
 Lolium perenne, (Perennial Ryegrass), Harman, etc.
 Phalaris aquatica, Beta-carbolines
 Phalaris arundinacea, Beta-carbolines

Lauraceae
 Nectandra megapotamica, Beta-carbolines

Leguminosae
 Acacia baileyana, Tetrahydroharman
 Acacia complanata, Tetrahydroharman, etc.
 Burkea africana, Harman, etc.
 Desmodium gangeticum, Beta-carbolines
 Desmodium gyrans, Beta-carbolines
 Desmodium pulchellum, Harman, etc.
 Mucuna pruriens, 6-Methoxy-Harman
 Petalostylis labicheoides, Tetrahydroharman; MAO's up to 0.5%
 Prosopis nigra, Harman, etc.
 Shepherdia pulchellum, Beta-carbolines

Loganiaceae
 Strychnos melinoniana, Beta-carbolines
 Strychnos usambarensis, Harman

Malpighiaceae
 Banisteriopsis argentia, 5-methoxytetrahydroharman, (−)-N(6)-methoxytetrahydroharman, dimethyltryptamine-N(6)-oxide
 Banisteriopsis caapi, Harmine 0.31–0.84%, tetrahydroharmine, telepathine, dihydroshihunine, 5-MeO-DMT in bark
 Banisteriopsis inebrians, Beta-carbolines
 Banisteriopsis lutea, Harmine, telepathine
 Banisteriopsis metallicolor, Harmine, telepathine
 Banisteriopsis muricata Harmine up to 6%, harmaline up to 4%, plus DMT
 Diplopterys cabrerana, Beta-carbolines
 Cabi pratensis, Beta-carbolines
 Callaeum antifebrile(syn. Cabi paraensis), Harmine
 Tetrapterys methystica(syn. Tetrapteris methystica), Harmine

Myristicaceae
 Gymnacranthera paniculata, Beta-carbolines
 Horsfieldia superba Beta-carbolines
 Virola cuspidata, 6-Methoxy-Harman
 Virola rufula, Beta-carbolines
 Virola theiodora, Beta-carbolines

Ochnaceae
 Testulea gabonensis, Beta-carbolines

Palmae
 Plectocomiopsis geminiflora, Beta-carbolines

Papaveraceae
 Meconopsis horridula, Beta-carbolines
 Meconopsis napaulensis, Beta-carbolines 
 Meconopsis paniculata, Beta-carbolines
 Meconopsis robusta, Beta-carbolines
 Meconopsis rudis, Beta-carbolines
 Papaver rhoeas, Beta-carbolines

Passifloraceae
 Passiflora actinia, Harman
 Passiflora alata, Harman 
 Passiflora alba, Harman
 Passiflora bryonoides, Harman
 Passiflora caerulea, Harman
 Passiflora capsularis, Harman
 Passiflora decaisneana, Harman
 Passiflora edulis, Harman, 0–7001 ppm in fruit
 Passiflora eichleriana, Harman

 Passiflora foetida, Harman
 Passiflora incarnata (with bee), Harmine, Harmaline, Harman, etc. 0.03%. Alkaloids in rind of fruit 0.25%
 Passiflora quadrangularis, Harman 
 Passiflora ruberosa, Harman
 Passiflora subpeltata, Harman
 Passiflora warmingii, Harman

Polygonaceae
 Calligonum minimum, Beta-carbolines
 Leptactinia densiflora, Leptaflorine, etc.
 Ophiorrhiza japonica, Harman
 Pauridiantha callicarpoides, Harman
 Pauridiantha dewevrei, Harman
 Pauridiantha lyalli, Harman
 Pauridiantha viridiflora, Harman
 Simira klugei, Harman
 Simira rubra, Harman

Rubiaceae
 Borreria verticillata, Beta-carbolines
 Leptactinia densiflora, Beta-carbolines
 Nauclea diderrichii, Beta-carbolines
 Ophiorrhiza japonica, Beta-carbolines
 Pauridiantha callicarpoides, Beta-carbolines
 Pauridiantha dewevrei, Beta-carbolines
 Pauridiantha yalli, Beta-carbolines
 Pauridiantha viridiflora, Beta-carbolines
 Pavetta lanceolata, Beta-carbolines
 Psychotria carthagenensis, Beta-carbolines
 Psychotria viridis, Beta-carbolines
 Simira klugei, Beta-carbolines
 Simira rubra, Beta-carbolines
 Uncaria attenuata, Beta-carbolines
 Uncaria canescens, Beta-carbolines
 Uncaria orientalis, Beta-carbolines

Rutaceae
 Tetradium (syn. Evodia) species: Some contain carbolines
 Euodia leptococca Beta-carboline
 Araliopsis tabouensis, Beta-carbolines
 Flindersia laevicarpa, Beta-carbolines
 Xanthoxylum rhetsa, Beta-carbolines

Sapotaceae
 Chrysophyllum lacourtianum, Norharman etc.
 Scutellaria???
 Scutellaria nana???

Simaroubaceae
 Ailanthus malabarica, Beta-carbolines. See also Nag Champa.
 Perriera madagascariensis, Beta-carbolines
 Picrasma ailanthoides, Beta-carbolines
 Picrasma crenata, Beta-carbolines
 Picrasma excelsa, Beta-carbolines
 Picrasma javanica, Beta-carbolines

Solanaceae
 Vestia foetida, (Syn V. lycioides) Beta-carbolines

Symplocaceae
 Symplocos racemosa, Harman

Tiliaceae
 Grewia mollis, Beta-carbolines

Zygophyllaceae
 Fagonia cretica, Harman
 Nitraria schoberi, Beta-carbolines
 Peganum harmala, (Syrian Rue), The seeds contain about 2–6% alkaloids, most of which is harmaline. Peganum harmala is also an abortifacient.
 Peganum nigellastrum, Harmine
 Tribulus terrestris, Harman 
 Zygophyllum fabago, Harman, harmine

Opiates

Opiates are the natural products of many plants, the most famous and historically relevant of which is Papaver somniferum. Opiates are defined as natural products (or their esters and salts that revert to the natural product in the human body), whereas opioids are defined as semi-synthetic or fully synthetic compounds that trigger the Opioid receptor of the mu sub-type. Other opiate receptors, such as kappa- and delta-opiate receptors are part of this system but do not cause the characteristic behavioral depression and analgesia which is mostly mediated through the mu-opiate receptor. 

An opiate, in classical pharmacology, is a substance derived from opium. In more modern usage, the term opioid is used to designate all substances, both natural and synthetic, that bind to opioid receptors in the brain (including antagonists). Opiates are alkaloid compounds naturally found in the Papaver somniferum plant (opium poppy). The psychoactive compounds found in the opium plant include morphine, codeine, and thebaine. Opiates have long been used for a variety of medical conditions with evidence of opiate trade and use for pain relief as early as the eighth century AD. Opiates are considered drugs with moderate to high abuse potential and are listed on various "Substance-Control Schedules" under the Uniform Controlled Substances Act of the United States of America.

In 2014, between 13 and 20 million people used opiates recreationally (0.3% to 0.4% of the global population between the ages of 15 and 65). According to the CDC, from this population, there were 47,000 deaths, with a total of 500,000 deaths from 2000 to 2014. In 2016, the World Health Organization reported that 27 million people suffer from Opioid use disorder. They also reported that in 2015, 450,000 people died as a result of drug use, with between a third and a half of that number being attributed to opioids.

Papaver somniferum
morphine
codeine
thebaine
oripavine

Mitragyna speciosa
mitragynine
7-Hydroxymitragynine
mitragynine pseudoindoxyl

Picralima nitida
Akuammicine
Pericine It may also have convulsant effects.

Psychotria colorata
Hodgkinsine

Aspidosperma spp.
Akuammicine

Plants containing other psychoactive substances

See also 
 Aztec entheogenic complex
 Entheogenic drugs and the archaeological record
 God in a Pill?
 Hallucinogenic fish
 Hallucinogenic plants in Chinese herbals
 List of Acacia species known to contain psychoactive alkaloids
 List of entheogenic/hallucinogenic species
 List of plants used for smoking
 List of poisonous plants
 List of psychoactive plants, fungi, and animals
 Louisiana State Act 159
 N,N-Dimethyltryptamine
 Psilocybin mushrooms
 Psychoactive cactus
 Psychoactive plant

Notes

References

Bibliography

External links 
 Descriptions of psychoactive Cacti. Lycaeum Visionary Cactus Guide
 Erowid Tryptamine FAQ – More Plants Containing Tryptamines
 John Stephen Glasby, Dictionary of Plants Containing Secondary Metabolites, Published by CRC Press
 Golden Guide to Hallucinogenic Plants
 Hallucinogens on the Internet: A Vast New Source of Underground Drug Information John H. Halpern, M.D. and Harrison G. Pope, Jr., M.D.
 Chemical Investigations of the Alkaloids from the Plants of the Family Elaeocarpaceae – Peter L. Katavic, Chemical Investigations of the Alkaloids From the Plants Of The Family Elaeocarpaceae, School of Science/Natural Product Discovery (NPD), Faculty of Science, Griffith University
 Alexander T. Shulgin, Psychotomimetic Drugs: Structure-Activity Relationships
 UNODC The plant kingdom and hallucinogens (part II)
 UNODC The plant kingdom and hallucinogens (part III)
 Virola – Dried Herbarium Specimens
 Virola Species Pictures – USGS
 Desmanthus illinoensis – USDA
 Psychedelic Reader (Google Books)

Entheogens
 
Medicinal plants
Lists of plants

Hallucinations